Rosstrevor, New South Wales in Central Darling Shire is a remote rural locality and civil parish of Yungnulgra County in far North West New South Wales.

Geography
The Parish an arid landscape. The parish has a Köppen climate classification of BWh (Hot desert),. is almost unpopulated, with less than two inhabitants per square kilometer.
The nearest town is Whitecliffs 2 km to the west.

Climate
The parish has extremely hot summers and mild winters.

History

The Parish is on the traditional lands of the Wandjiwalgu. 
Aboriginal peoples.

In 1838 Thomas Mitchell (explorer) travelled down the nearby Darling River. Charles Sturt passed through the Wandjiwalgu lands during 1845, and in 1861 the Burke and Wills expedition passed nearby.

References

Localities in New South Wales